The 2017–18 Philippine Basketball Association (PBA) Philippine Cup Finals was the best-of-7 championship series of the 2017–18 PBA Philippine Cup and the conclusion of the conference's playoffs. The San Miguel Beermen and the Magnolia Hotshots competed for the 40th Philippine Cup championship and the 122nd overall championship contested by the league. San Miguel won the series in 5 games to be the first team in history to win four straight Philippine Cup titles.

Background

Road to the finals

Head-to-head matchup

Series summary

Game summaries

Game 1

Game 2

Game 3

Game 4

Game 5

Rosters

{| class="toccolours" style="font-size: 95%; width: 100%;"
|-
! colspan="2" style="background-color: #; color: #; text-align: center;" | San Miguel Beermen 2017–18 PBA Philippine Cup roster
|- style="background-color:#; color: #; text-align: center;"
! Players !! Coaches
|-
| valign="top" |
{| class="sortable" style="background:transparent; margin:0px; width:100%;"
! Pos. !! # !! POB !! Name !! Height !! Weight !! !! College
|-

{| class="toccolours" style="font-size: 95%; width: 100%;"
|-
! colspan="2" style="background-color: #; color: #; text-align: center;" | Magnolia Hotshots 2017–18 PBA Philippine Cup roster
|- style="background-color:#EB1B22; color: #FFFFFF; text-align: center;"
! Players !! Coaches
|-
| valign="top" |
{| class="sortable" style="background:transparent; margin:0px; width:100%;"
! Pos. !! # !! POB !! Name !! Height !! Weight !! !! College
|-

Broadcast notes
The Philippine Cup Finals was aired on TV5 with simulcasts on PBA Rush (both in standard and high definition). TV5's radio arm, Radyo5 provided the radio play-by-play coverage. 

ESPN5 also provided online livestreaming via their official YouTube account using the 5 Network feed.

The PBA Rush broadcast provided English-language coverage of the Finals.

Additional Game 5 crew:
Trophy presentation: Magoo Marjon
Dugout celebration interviewer: Apple David

References

External links
PBA official website

2018
2017–18 PBA season
Magnolia Hotshots games
San Miguel Beermen games
PBA Philippine Cup Finals
PBA Philippine Cup Finals